The British American Security Information Council (BASIC) is a non-partisan think tank based in London. BASIC takes an inclusive approach to promote nuclear disarmament and non-proliferation by working with politicians, civil society, and other people who share this vision, as well as with those who might oppose it.

Projects
BASIC currently has projects related to the UK Trident nuclear weapons debate, non-proliferation in the Middle East, and reframing the nuclear weapons debate. BASIC is also linked with the UK all-party parliamentary group on Global Security and Non-Proliferation. BASIC published the final report of the Trident Commission in July 2014, an independent and cross-party commission, co-chaired by Lord Browne of Ladyton, Sir Malcolm Rifkind, and Sir Menzies Campbell, examining the complexity of issues and options facing the UK government in the decision on its nuclear deterrent and its non-proliferation policy. The report recommended the continuation of the British nuclear program, conditional upon a number of actions needed to mitigate the negative impacts.

Organization details
BASIC has charitable status in the United Kingdom.

See also
Federation of American Scientists
Treaty on the Non-Proliferation of Nuclear Weapons
Comprehensive Nuclear-Test-Ban Treaty

References

External links
British American Security Information Council official website

Anti–nuclear weapons movement
Foreign policy and strategy think tanks in the United States
Foreign policy and strategy think tanks based in the United Kingdom
International security
Arms control